Herbert Pike (1863 – ) known as Harry was an English footballer who played in the Football Alliance and FA Cup for Nottingham Forest.

Harry Pike was a member of the Pike family from Keyworth which produced cricketers and footballers. These included Horace Pike and Arthur Pike. On 4 January 1890, Horace, Arthur and Harry all played in the same Nottingham Forest side in a home match against Sheffield Wednesday. Forest lost 3-1.

References

People from Keyworth
Footballers from Nottinghamshire
Nottingham Forest F.C. players
1863 births
Date of death missing
English footballers
Association footballers not categorized by position